Lester Etien (born 21 June 1995) is a French rugby union player who plays for Stade Français in the Top 14 and the French national team. His position is wing.

References

External links 
 Stade Français profile

French rugby union players
Stade Français players
People from Créteil
Rugby union wings
1995 births
Living people